The Hutt Recreation Ground is a football, cricket and rugby union ground in Lower Hutt, Wellington, New Zealand. The grounds are owned by the Hutt City Council and managed for them by Downer.

History
In 1905 the area was first used for recreation when the lot was used by the Hutt Amateur Athletic Club. It was subsequently purchased by the city council and in 1908 the premises were upgraded. The first grandstand at the ground was constructed in 1933 as part of a public works scheme to provide employment relief during the Great Depression.

It is the home ground for the Hutt Districts cricket club. The first recorded cricket match held on the ground came in 1949 when Hutt Valley played Nelson in the 1948/49 Hawke Cup.

A single List A cricket match was played there in 1971 when Wellington played Central Districts in the 1971/72 New Zealand Motor Corporation Knock-Out, which Wellington won by 47 runs.  The ground later held its first first-class match during the 1976/77 Shell Trophy when Wellington played Northern Districts.  Wellington defeated the West indies in a three-day match at the ground in February 1980, with Ewen Chatfield claiming 13 wickets for the match. Between the 1976/77 and 1985/86 season, the ground held fourteen first-class matches, the last of which saw Wellington play Canterbury.  Between 1982 and 1990, four Women's One Day Internationals were held there.

In rugby union the ground is used by the Hutt Old Boys-Marist, while in rugby league the Wellington rugby league team has played there. The ground has also hosted international football matches, including a match in the 1987 Trans-Tasman Cup between New Zealand and Australia.

In 1976 the ground hosted the Men's Softball World Championship. The tournament was controversial due to the participation of Apartheid era South Africa. Prior to its start, an opponent to South Africa's involvement, planted an incendiary bomb in the middle of the ground's softball diamond which exploded and damaged a 10 metre radius. Several city council members, led by councillor John Seddon, unsuccessfully tried to block the South African team playing.

In September 2014, it was announced that A-League club Wellington Phoenix would host three matches of the 2014–15 A-League at the ground due to their permanent home ground, Wellington Regional Stadium, being temporarily unavailable whilst hosting the 2015 Cricket World Cup. Temporary seating increase the venue to 9,000-capacity.

Notes

References

External links
Hutt Recreation Ground at ESPNcricinfo
Hutt Recreation Ground at CricketArchive

Cricket grounds in New Zealand
Rugby union stadiums in New Zealand
Rugby league stadiums in New Zealand
Association football venues in New Zealand
Sports venues in the Wellington Region